This list of rulers of Estonia starts with the ancient counties (maakond) and parishes (kihelkond) each headed by Seniores and Meliores (Elders) as noted by Henry of Livonia. The administrative jurisdiction of the parish and county elders was limited, the counties themselves remained autonomous until the Teutonic and Danish conquest of Estonia in the 13th century. Ending with the states and the rulers of states (starting from the time of the first successful Danish conquest in 1219) who either ruled or laid claims of sovereignty over some parts of the territory of present-day Estonia, as well as the leaders of the independent Republic of Estonia since 1918.

Ancient counties

Alempois
Title: Elder (-1224)

Harju
Title: Elder (-1224)

Järva
Title: Elder (-1224)

Jogentagana
Title: Elder (-1224)

Läänemaa
Title: Elder (-1224)

Mõhu
Title: Elder (-1224)

Nurmekund
Title: Elder (-1224)

Revala
Title: Elder (-1224)

Saaremaa
Title: Elder – It is probable that these men, whose names appear on a treaty with the Order of the Brethren of the Sword in 1251, were the chiefs of administrative units on Saaremaa, Muhu, and Sõrve. Their "signatures" were, in all likelihood, phonetically "Latinized" by the authors of the document.

Ylle
Culle
Enu
Muntelene
Tappete
Yalde
Melete
Cake

Sakala
Title: Elder (-1223)
 before 1211–21 September 1217 Lembitu
 21 September 1217 – ? Unnepeve
 Meeme

Ugandi
Title: Elder (-1224)

Vaiga
Title: Elder (-1224)

Virumaa
Title: Elder (-1224)
 Kyriavanus
 Tabelinus

Rulers of Estonia

Part of the Kingdom of Denmark

House of Estridsen 

In 1346, Northern Estonia is sold to the Livonian Order. This Order was already ruling Southern Estonia since 1237.

Southern Estonia

Bishoprics of Livonia (Bishopric of Riga) and Estonia (Bishopric of Leal)

Livonian Order

 1237–1238 Hermann Balk (Balke)
 1238–1241 Dietrich von Grüningen
 1241–1244 Andreas von Velven (Felben)
 1244–1245 Heinrich von Heimburg
 1245–1247 Dietrich von Grüningen
 1247–1253 Andreas von Stirland
 1253–1254 Eberhard von Seine (Seyn)
 1254–1257 Anno von Sangershausen
 1257–1261 Burchard von Hornhausen
 1261 ....... Georg von Eichstadt
 1261–1263 Werner von Breithausen
 1263–1266 Konrad von Mandern (Manstadt)
 1266–1270 Otto von Lutterberg
 1271 ....... Andreas von Westphalen
 1271–1273 Walther von Nordeck (Nortecken)
 1273–1279 Ernst von Ratzeburg (Rassburg)
 1279–1280 Gerhard von Katzenelnbogen
 1280–1282 Konrad von Feuchtwangen
 1282 ....... Mangold von Sternberg (Manhold von Sternberg)
 1282–1288 Wilhelm von Nindorf (Wilken von Endorp, Willekin von Endorp)
 1288–1290 Konrad von Hazzigenstein (Konrad von Hattstein, Konrad von Herzogenstein)
 1290–1293 Halt von Hohembach (Balthasar Holte)
 1294–1295 Heinrich von Dinkelaghe (Heinrich II von Dumpshagen)
 1296–1298 Bruno
 1298–1305 Gottfried von Rogge
 1305–1306 Wennemar I
 1307–1322 Gerhard von Jork (Gerhard II von Jocke, Conrad von Jocke or Conrad von Jorke)
 1322–1324 Konrad Kesselhut (Konrad Ketelhoed, Johannes Ungenade)
 1324–1328 Reimar Hane
 1328–1340 Eberhard von Monheim
 1340–1345 Burchard von Dreileben
 1345–1346 Goswin von Herike

Northern and Southern Estonia (reunited)

Livonian Order

 1346–1359 Goswin von Herike
 1359–1364 Arnold von Vietinghof
 1364–1385 Wilhelm von Friemersheim (Vrymersheim, Vrimersheim)
 1385–1388 Robin von Eltz
 1388–1389 Johann von Ohle
 1389–1401 Wennemar von Bruggenei (Wennemar Hasenkamp von Brüggeneye, Wolmer von Brüggeney)
 1401–1413 Konrad von Vietinghof
 1413–1415 Dietrich Tork
 1415–1424 Siegfried Lander von Spanheim
 1424–1433 Cysse von Rutenberg (Zisse, Cisse von dem Rutenberg)
 1433–1435 Frank von Kersdorf
 1435–1437 Heinrich von Bockenvorde (Schüngel)
 1438–1450 Heinrich Vincke von Oberbergen (Overberg)
 1450–1469 Johann von Mengeden (Osthoff)
 1470–1471 Johann Wolthus von Herse
 1471–1483 Bernhard von der Borch
 1483–1494 Johann Freitag von Loringhoven
 1494–1535 Wolter von Plettenberg
 1535–1549 Hermann von Bruggenei (Hermann Hasenkamp von Brüggeneye)
 1549–1551 Johann von der Recke
 1551–1557 Heinrich von Galen
 1557–1559 Johann Wilhelm von Fürstenberg
 1559–1561 Gotthard Kettler

1247–1251 vacant
1251–1263 Unknown person
1263–1268 Alexander
1268–1288 Friedrich von Haseldorf
1289–1299 Bernhard I
1303–1312 Dietrich II Vyshusen
1312–1313 vacant
1313–1323 Nikolaus (acting)
1323–1341 Engelbert von Dolen
1341–1342 vacant
1342–1344 Wescelus
1344–1346 vacant
1346–1373 Johannes I Viffhusen
1373–1377 Heinrich I Velde
1377–1379 vacant
1379–1400 Dietrich III Damerow
1400–1400 vacant
1400–1410 Heinrich II Wrangel
1410–1411 vacant
1411–1413 Bernhard II Bülow
1413–1440 Dietrich IV Resler
1440–1442 vacant
1442–1459 Bartholomäus Savijerwe
1459–1468 Helmich von Mallinkrodt
1468–1468 vacant
1468–1473 Andreas Peper
1473–1473 vacant
1473–1485 Johannes II Bertkow
1485–1485 vacant
1485–1498 Dietrich V Hake
1498–1499 vacant
1499–1505 Johannes III von der Rope
1505–1513 Gerhard Schrove
1513–1514 vacant
1514–1514 Johannes IV Duesborg
1514–1518 Christian Bomhower
1518–1518 vacant
1518–1527 Johannes V Blankenfeld, Archbishop of Riga (1524–1527)
1527–1532 vacant
1532–1543 Johannes VII Bey
1543–1544 vacant
1544–1551 Jodokus von der Recke (Jost von der Recke)
1551–1554 vacant
1554–1558 Hermann II Wesel

In 1558, during the Livonian War, Dorpat ceased to exist.

1229–1234 vacant
1234–1260 Heinrich I
1260–1262 vacant
1262–1285? Herman I de Bekeshoevede
1285?–1290? vacant
1290?–1294 Heinrich II
1294–1297? vacant
1297?–1307? Konrad I
1307?–1310 vacant
1310–1321 Hartung (Garttungus)
1321–1322 vacant
1322–1337 Jakob
1337–1338 vacant
1338–1362 Hermann II Osenbrügge
1362–1363 vacant
1363–1374 Konrad II
1374–1381 Heinrich III
1381–1385 vacant
1385–1419 Winrich von Kniprode
1419–1420 vacant
1420–1423 Kaspar Schuwenflug
1423–1423 vacant
1423–1432 Christian Kuband
1432–1432 vacant
1432–1438 Johannes I Schutte
1438–1439 vacant
1439–1449 Ludolf Grove (acting)
1449–1449 Ludolf Grove (acting in Saaremaa (Ösel)); Johannes II Creul (in Läänemaa (Wiek); Bishop since 1939)
1449–1457 Ludolf Grove (in Saaremaa (Ösel)); Johannes II Creul (in Läänemaa (Wiek))
1457–1458 Ludolf Grove
1458–1458 vacant
1458–1463 Johannes Vatelkanne (acting)
1463–1468 Johannes Vatelkanne (acting); Jodokus Hoenstein (Bishop since 1460)
1468–1471 Jodokus Hoenstein
1471–1471 vacant
1471–1491 Peter Wedberg (Wetberch)
1491–1515 Johannes III Orgas
1515–1527 Johannes IV Kievel
1527–1527 vacant
1527–1530 Georg von Tiesenhausen
1530–1532 vacant
1532–1541 Reinhold von Buxhövden
1532–1534 Reinhold von Buxhövden (in Saaremaa (Ösel); Wilhelm (acting in Läänemaa (Wiek))
1534–1541 Reinhold von Buxhövden
1541–1542 vacant
1542–1559 Johannes V von Münchhausen
1559–1572 Magnus, Duke of Holstein
1572–1573 vacant

In 1573, Ösel-Wiek was annexed by Denmark.

Duchy of Estonia

Part of the Swedish Empire (1561–1721)

House of Vasa 

|width=auto|Eric XIV (Erik XIV)  1561– 29 September 1568||||Tre Kronor (castle), 13 December 1533 son of Gustav I and Catherine of Saxe-Lauenburg||Karin Månsdotter||Died (Poisoned) while imprisoned in Örbyhus Castle, 26 February 1577. Aged 43, buried at Västerås Cathedral
|-
|width=auto|John III (Johan III) 30 September 1568 – 17 November 1592||||Stegeborg Castle, Östergötland, 20 December 1537 son of Gustav I and Margaret Leijonhufvud||Catherine Jagellonica (1562 – 1583),Gunilla Bielke (1585–1597)||Tre Kronor (castle), 17 November 1592, aged 54, buried at Uppsala Cathedral
|-
|width=auto|Sigmund (Sigismund) 17 November 1592 – 24 July 1599||||Gripsholm Castle, 20 June 1566, son of John III and Catherine Jagellonica of Poland.||Anna of Austria (1592–1598),Constance of Austria (1605–1631)||Warsaw, Poland, 30 April 1632, aged 65, buried at Wawel Cathedral, Kraków, Poland
|-
|width=auto|Charles IX (Karl IX)  22 March 1604 – 30 October 1611  also as regent Duke Charles, 1599–1604||||Tre Kronor (castle), 4 October 1550 son of Gustav I and Margaret Leijonhufvud||Maria of Palatinate-Simmern (1579–1589),Christina of Holstein-Gottorp (1592–1611)||Nyköping Castle, 30 October 1611, aged 61, buried at Strängnäs Cathedral
|-
|width=auto|Gustav II Adolph (Gustav II Adolf)  30 October 1611 – 6 November 1632||||Tre Kronor (castle), 9 December 1594, son of Charles IX and Christina of Holstein-Gottorp.||Maria Eleonora of Brandenburg||6 November 1632, in the Battle of Lützen, Electorate of Saxony, aged 37, buried in Riddarholmen Church
|-
|width=auto|Christina (Kristina) 6 November 1632 – 6 June 1654||||Stockholm, 8 December 1626, daughter of Gustavus Adolphus and Maria Eleonora of Brandenburg||Unmarried||Rome, 19 April 1689, aged 62, buried at St. Peter's Basilica, Vatican City
|-
|}

House of Palatinate-Zweibrücken, a branch of the House of Wittelsbach 

|Charles X Gustav (Karl X Gustav)  6 June 1654 – 13 February 1660||||Nyköping Castle, 8 November 1622, son of John Casimir, Count Palatine of Zweibrücken-Kleeburg and Catharina of Sweden (daughter of Charles IX)||Hedwig Eleonora of Holstein-Gottorp||Gothenburg, 13 February 1660, aged 37, buried in Riddarholmen Church
|-
|Charles XI (Karl XI)  13 February 1660 – 5 April 1697||||Tre Kronor (castle), 24 November 1655 son of Charles X and Hedwig Eleonora of Holstein-Gottorp||Ulrike Eleonora of Denmark||Tre Kronor (castle), 5 April 1697, aged 41, buried in Riddarholmen Church
|-
|Charles XII (Karl XII)  5 April 1697 – 30 November 1718||||Tre Kronor (castle), 17 June 1682 son of Charles XI and Ulrika Eleonora the Elder||Unmarried||Fredrikshald, Norway, 30 November 1718, aged 36, buried in Riddarholmen Church
|-
|Ulrica Eleanor (Ulrika Eleonora) 5 December 1718 – 29 February 1720||||Tre Kronor (castle), 23 January 1688 daughter of Charles XI and Ulrika Eleonora the Elder||Frederick I, Landgrave of Hesse-Kassel||Stockholm, 24 November 1741, aged 53, buried in Riddarholmen Church
|-
|}

House of Hesse 

|width=auto|Frederick (Fredrik I av Hessen) 24 March 1720 – 10 September 1721||||Kassel, (in today's Germany), 23 April 1676 son of Charles I, Landgrave of Hesse-Kassel and Princess Maria Amalia of Courland||Louise Dorothea of Prussia Ulrika Eleonora of Sweden||Stockholm, 25 March 1751, aged 74, buried in Riddarholmen Church
|-
|}

On 10 September 1721, Sweden ceded Estonia to the Tsardom of Russia, in the Treaty of Nystad.

Governors during Swedish rule
1561–1562  
1562–1562 Henrik Klasson Horn
1562–1564 Svante Stensson Sture
1564–1565  
1565–1568 Henrik Klasson Horn
1568–1570  
1570–1572  
1572–1574 Clas Åkesson Tott
1574–1575 Pontus de la Gardie
1576–1578 
1576–1577 Nilsson Hans Eriksson Finne
1577–1580  
1580–1581  
1582–1583 Göran Boije af Gennäs (2nd time)
1583–1585 Pontus De la Gardie
1585–1588 
1588–1588 Hans Wachtmeister
1588–1590 Gustaf Axelsson Banér
1590–1592 
1592–1600 Göran Boije af Gennäs (3rd time)
1600–1601  
1601–1602  
1605–1608 Axel Nilsson Ryning 
1611–1617 Gabriel Bengtsson Oxenstierna
1617–1619 Anders Eriksson Hästehufvud
1619–1622 Jacob de la Gardie
1622–1626 Per Gustafsson Banér
1626–1628  
1628–1642  
1642–1646 
1646–1653  
1653–1655  
1655–1656 
1656–1674  
1674–1681 Andreas Lennartson Torstensson
1681–1687 Robert Johannson Lichton
1687–1704 Axel Julius De la Gardie
1704–1706 Wolmar Anton von Schlippenbach
1706–1709 Niels Jonsson Stromberg af Clastorp
1709–1710 Carl Gustaf von Nieroth

Part of the Russian Empire (1721–1917)

House of Romanov

Governors during Russian rule 
1710–1711 Rudolph Felix Bauer – General-Governor
1711–1719 Prince Aleksandr Danilovich Menshikov – General-Governor
1719–1728 Count Fyodor Matveyevich Apraksin – General-Governor
1728–1736 Friedrich Baron von Löwen
1736–1738 Sebastian Ernst von Manstein
1738–1740 Gustaf Otto Douglas
1740–1743 Woldemar von Löwendahl
1743–1753 Peter August Friedrich von Holstein-Beck (1696–1775)
1753–1758 Prince Vladimir Petrovich Dolgorukiy
1758–1775 Peter August Friedrich von Holstein-Beck – General-Governor
1775–1792 Count George Browne – General-Governor
1783–1786 Georg Friedrich von Grotenhielm
1786–1797 Heinrich Johann Baron von Wrangell
1797–1808 Andreas von Langell
1808–1809 Peter Friedrich Georg von Oldenburg (1784–1812)
1809–1811 Vacant
1811–1816 Grand Duke Paul Friedrich August von Oldenburg (1783–1853)
1816–1819 Berend Baron Üxküll
1819–1832 Gotthard Wilhelm Baron Budberg von Bönninghausen
1832–1833  Otto Wilhelm von Essen
1833–1841 Paul Friedrich von Benckendorff
1842–1859 Johann Christoph Engelbrecht von Grünewaldt
1859–1868 Wilhelm Otto Cornelius Alexander Ulrich
1868–1870 Mikhail Nikolaiyevich Galkin-Vraskoy
1870–1875 Prince Mikhail Valentinovich Shakhovskoiy-Glebov-Strezhnev
1875–1885 Viktor Petrovich Polivanov
1885–1894 Prince Sergey Vladimirovich
1894–1902 Yefstafiy Nikolaiyevich Skalon
1902–1905 Aleksey Valerianovich Bellegarde
1905–1906 Nikolay Georgiyevich von Bünting
1906–1907 Pyotr Petrovich Bashilov
1907–1915 Izmail Vladimirovich Korostovetch
1915–1917 Pyotr Vladimirovich Veryovkin

Russian Provisional Government, 1917 

Title: Chairman (1917)

Georgy Evgenyevich Lvov (15 March (2 March) – 21 July (8 July) 1917)

Title: Prime Minister (1917)

Alexander Kerensky (21 July (8 July) – 7 November (25 October) 1917)

Part of the German Empire (1917–1918)

House of Hohenzollern

The Russian Revolution of 1917 
(independent de facto)

Title: Chairman of the Soviet Executive Committee of Estonia (Eestimaa Nõukogude Täitevkomitee esimees) (1917–18)

Jaan Anvelt (5 November (23 October) 1917 – 4 March 1918)

(independent de jure)

Title: Gouvernement Commissioner (Kubermangukomissar) (1917–18)

Jaan Poska (28 November (15 November) 1917 – 24 February 1918)

Republic of Estonia 

Title: Prime Minister (Peaminister) (1919–1920)

Otto August Strandman (9 May – 18 November 1919)
Jaan Tõnisson (18 November 1919 – 28 July 1920)
Ado (Aadu) Birk (28 – 30 July 1920)
Jaan Tõnisson (30 July – 26 October 1920)
Ants Piip (26 October – 20 December 1920)

Title: Head of State (Riigivanem) (1920–34)

Ants Piip (20 December 1920 – 25 January 1921)
Konstantin Päts (25 January 1921 – 21 November 1922)
Juhan (Johann) Kukk (21 November 1922 – 2 August 1923)
Konstantin Päts (2 August 1923 – 26 March 1924)
Friedrich Karl Akel (26 March 1924 – 16 December 1924)
Jüri Jaakson (16 December 1924 – 15 December 1925)
Jaan Teemant (15 December 1925 – 9 December 1927)
Jaan Tõnisson (9 December 1927 – 4 December 1928)
August Rei (4 December 1928 – 9 July 1929)
Otto August Strandman (9 July 1929 – 12 February 1931)
Konstantin Päts (12 February 1931 – 19 February 1932)
Jaan Teemant (19 February 1932 – 19 July 1932)
Kaarel Eenpalu (19 July 1932 – 1 November 1932)
Konstantin Päts (1 November 1932 – 18 May 1933)
Jaan Tõnisson (18 May 1933 – 21 October 1933)
Konstantin Päts (21 October 1933 – 24 January 1934)

Title: Prime Minister acting Head of State (Peaminister Riigivanema ülesannetes) (1934–37)

Konstantin Päts (24 January 1934 – 3 September 1937)

Title: President-Regent (Riigihoidja) (1937–1938)

Konstantin Päts (3 September 1937 – 24 April 1938)

Title: President of the Republic (1938–40)

Konstantin Päts (24 April 1938 – 21 June 1940)
Johannes Vares (21 June – 21 July 1940 (Prime Minister acting as the President of Repuvblic, Soviet-installed collaborant)

Title: Prime Minister acting President (Peaminister Vabariigi Presidendi ülesandeis) (1940–92)

Jüri Uluots (21 June 1940 – 9 January 1945)
August Rei (9 January 1945 – 29 March 1963)
Aleksander Varma (Warma) (30 March 1963 – 23 December 1970)
Tõnis Kint (23 December 1970 – 1 March 1990)
Heinrich Mark (1 March 1990 – 15 September 1992)

Title: Acting Prime Minister (Peaministri asetäitja) (since 1944)

Otto Tief (18 September 1944 – 12 January 1944, since 10 October 1944 Soviet prisoner)
Johannes Sikkar
Aleksander Warma
Tõnis Kint
Heinrich Mark
Enno Penno

Title: Chairman of the Supreme Council of the Republic of Estonia (in the body of Soviet Union) (1990–91)

Arnold Rüütel (8 May 1990 – 20 August 1991)

Title: Chairman of the Supreme Council of the Republic of Estonia (Eesti Vabariigi Ülemnõukogu esimees) (1991–92)

Arnold Rüütel (20 August 1991 – 6 October 1992)

United Baltic Duchy 
Title: Regent Councillor (1918)

Adolf Pilar von Pilchau (9–19 November 1918)

Commune of the Working People of Estonia 
Title: Chairman of the Council of The Commune of the Working People of Estonia (Eesti Töörahva Komuuna Nõukogu esimees) (1918–19)

Jaan Anvelt (29 November 1918 – 5 June 1919)

Estonia during the Soviet occupation 
Title: Chairman of the Presidium of the Supreme Soviet of Estonian SSR (Eesti NSV Ülemnõukogu Presiidiumi esimees) (1940–88)

Johannes Vares-Barbarus (21 July 1940 – 29 November 1946)
Nigol Andresen (1946–47)
Eduard Päll (1947–50)
August Jakobson (1950–58)
Johan Eichfeld (1958–61)
Aleksei Müürisepp (1961 – 7 October 1970)
Aleksander Ansberg (1970)
Artur Vader (22 December 1970 –  25 May 1978)
Meta Vannas (acting chairman; 1978)
Johannes Käbin (1978–83)
Arnold Rüütel (8 April 1983 – 8 May 1990)

Title: Chairman of the Presidium of the Supreme Council of the Republic of Estonia (1990–1992)

Arnold Rüütel (8 May 1990 – 6 October 1992)

Soviet Union 
Title: Secretary General of the Central Committee of the Communist Party of the Soviet Union  (1940–91)

Joseph Stalin (1940–53)
Nikita Khrushchev (1953–64)
Leonid Brezhnev (1964–82)
Yuri Andropov (1982–84)
Konstantin Chernenko (1984–85)
Mikhail Gorbachev (1985–91)

Reichskommissariat Ostland 
Title: Führer und Reichskanzler (1941–44)
Adolf Hitler (7 July 1941 – 24 November 1944)
Title: Generalkomissar für Estland (1941–44)
Karl-Siegmund Litzmann (5 December 1941 – 18 September 1944)
Title: Eesti Omavalitsuse juht (1941–45)
Hjalmar Mäe (15 September 1941 – 4 January 1945)

See also 
History of Estonia
President of Estonia
List of Swedish monarchs
List of Russian monarchs
Lists of office-holders

References 

Estonia history-related lists
 
Estonia
Lists of Estonian people